Salong may refer to:

Salong, Micronesia
, a coaster
Salong, a barangay of the Municipality of Calaca, Batangas, Philippines